Nandamuri Taraka Rama Rao Jr. (born 20 May 1983), also known as Jr NTR or  Tarak, is an Indian actor who primarily works in Telugu cinema. One of the highest paid Telugu film actors, Rama Rao Jr. has won several accolades, including two  Filmfare Awards, two state Nandi Awards, and four CineMAA Awards. Since 2012, he has been featured in Forbes India Celebrity 100 list.For his movie, RRR  music director M. M.Kiravani, Lyricist Chandrabose got the AcademyAward(Oscars) For the Best Original Song.

Grandson of Indian matinee idol, N. T. Rama Rao Sr. who was also the former Chief Minister of the Indian state of Andhra Pradesh, Rao appeared as child actor in works such as Brahmarshi Viswamitra (1991), and Ramayanam (1997), the latter winning the National Film Award for Best Children's Film for that year. Rao made his debut as a lead actor with Ninnu Choodalani (2001). He rose to prominence with the coming-of-age film Student No. 1 (2001) and the action drama Aadi (2002).

Rao established himself as a leading actor in Telugu cinema with works such as Simhadri (2003), Rakhi (2006), Yamadonga (2007), Adhurs (2010), Brindavanam (2010), Baadshah (2013), Temper (2015), Nannaku Prematho (2016), Janatha Garage (2016), Jai Lava Kusa (2017), Aravinda Sametha Veera Raghava (2018), and RRR (2022), the latter being his highest-grossing release. He won two Filmfare Awards for Best Actor – Telugu for his performances in Yamadonga and Nannaku Prematho. He is also notable in the television industry. In 2017, he hosted the first season of the Telugu language reality TV show Bigg Boss on Star Maa. Rama Rao Jr. started hosting the fifth season of Evaru Meelo Koteeswarulu in 2021 on Gemini TV.

Early life and family 

Rama Rao was born on 20 May 1983 as son to film actor and politician, Nandamuri Harikrishna and Shalini Bhaskar Rao. His father is of Telugu descent and his mother is a Kannadiga, who hails from Kundapur, Karnataka. He is the grandson of Telugu actor and former Chief Minister of Andhra Pradesh, N. T. Rama Rao. Initially named Tarak, he was renamed as N. T. Rama Rao on the suggestion of his grandfather.

Rama Rao did his schooling at Vidyaranya High School, Hyderabad, and completed his intermediate education at St. Mary's College, Hyderabad. 

Rama Rao is a trained Kuchipudi dancer. He is the half-brother of actor and producer Nandamuri Kalyan Ram, the nephew of actor and politician Nandamuri Balakrishna and former Chief Minister of Andhra Pradesh, N. Chandrababu Naidu, and the cousin of actors Taraka Ratna and politician Nara Lokesh.

Acting career

1991–2006: Debut and initial career 
Rama Rao made his debut in the film Brahmarshi Vishwamitra (1991) as a child artiste at the age of seven. Written and directed by his grandfather N. T. Rama Rao, he played the role of Bharata. After a long gap, he then played the titular role of Rama in the Gunasekhar-directed mythological film Ramayanam (1997), which won the National Film Award for Best Children's Film. His performance in the film received critical appreciation.

Director K. Raghavendra Rao recommended Rama Rao to S. S. Rajamouli for his directorial debut Student No. 1 (2001) during mid-2000 after being impressed with his performance in the auditions and his previous film Ramayanam, however, the film went under production for too long. He was later signed by producer Ramoji Rao, and decided to work on the romantic drama Ninnu Choodalani which marked his debut as a lead actor. By that time, he was only 17. Student No. 1, which released later, went onto be successful while Subbu (2001) was a commercial failure.

In Aadi (2002) directed by debutant V. V. Vinayak, he played a man is trying to take revenge on a landlord for the death of his parents. The film was one of the highest-grossers of 2002. He went to appear in other films such as B. Gopal's Allari Ramudu (2002) and A. M. Rathnam's political thriller Naaga (2003). Simhadri  (2003), his second collaboration with Rajamouli, on a budget of ₹8.5 crore, the film ended up becoming the highest-grossing Telugu film in history at the time.[ He sported a new look, in order to get rid of the youth one, and grew a light beard. giving him the title of Young Tiger. He later quit youth films and started experimenting with faction dramas.

He next appeared in Puri Jagannadh's action drama Andhrawala (2004) created much hype but was a box office failure. He then starred in action film, Samba (2004) in his second collaboration with Vinayak. Later on he played a dual role in family drama film Naa Alludu (2005) and starred in Gopal's Narasimhudu (2005) and Surender Reddy's Ashok. All the three films failed at the box office. His performance in Krishna Vamsi's Rakhi (2006) is considered to be one of his finest.

2007–2012: Breakthrough and career fluctuations 
Rama Rao collaborated with director Rajamouli for the third time for a socio-fantasy film Yamadonga. For this film, he had to sport a new look by shedding more than 20 kg, as he used to be 94 kg. RamaRao played Raja, a thief who later criticizes and insults Yama and then suddenly goes into hell due to some bad acts. The film received positive reviews and made him receive Filmfare Award for Best Actor – Telugu. Actor Mohan  Babu praised Rama Rao's performance in the film. Rama Rao later signed up for the action film Kantri which was directed by debutant Meher Ramesh, a protege of Puri Jagannadh. In 2009, Rama Rao took a year hiatus to campaign for Telugu Desam Party (TDP) in the 2009 general elections.

Rama Rao signed up for the action-comedy Adhurs, in which he played dual roles for the third time after Andhrawala, and Naa Alludu. Adhurs grossed more than 300 million. He then returned to romantic films after several years in the romantic comedy Brindavanam (2011), directed by Vamsi Paidipally.

Rama Rao collaborated with director Ramesh for the fantasy action film Shakti, and with director Surender Reddy for the romantic action film Oosaravelli. The Boyapati Srinu-directed Dammu (2012) become an average grosser.

2013–present: Commercial successes 

In Baadshah, he sported a new look by straightening his curly hair and growing a beard, in order to suit the don image. The film became a sleeper hit. Baadshah's final figures was over 480 million in 50 days. This film was later dubbed into Hindi and Malayalam. Rama Rao's next release of 2013, was the revenge drama Ramayya Vasthavayya, directed by Harish Shankar. This was the worst period in Rama Rao's career and Baadshah was the only film that gave him success. Baadshah was premiered at the Osaka Asian Film Festival 2014 held in Japan.

In 2015, he starred in Temper directed by director Puri Jagannadh. The film gave a much-needed success for Rama Rao, after a series of debacles and his performance as a corrupted cop Daya who turns a good doer was appreciated by audience and critics alike.

Following the success of Temper, Rama Rao worked in Nannaku Prematho (2016) directed by Sukumar under the production of Sri Venkateswara Cine Chitra and Reliance Entertainment. He has second Filmfare Award for Best Actor – Telugu for his performance. NTR sported a new look with gelled up hair and long beard for the film. received positive reviews from critics and audience. Later in the same year, Rama Rao starred in the September release Janatha Garage, directed by Koratala Siva, where he was cast alongside the Malayalam actor Mohanlal. The film registered the highest opening for a Tollywood film in 2016, and was the second highest Tollywood opening of all time, behind Baahubali: The Beginning.  and became the highest grossing Telugu film of the year.

In 2017, Rama Rao essayed a triple role in Jai Lava Kusa under the direction of K. S. Ravindra on N.T.R. Arts banner with his half-brother Nandamuri Kalyan Ram as the producer. Jai Lava Kusa collected almost ₹130.90 crore worldwide and was successful at the box office with critics praising his triple role performance.

In 2018, he starred in Trivikram Srinivas-directed action drama Aravinda Sametha  which went become one of the highest-grossing Tollywood films of the year. Trivikram Srivinas credited Rama Rao for success of Aravinda Sametha. He said, “a highly-capable actor like NTR is very rare to find in any generation. When it comes to acting, He is like a torchbearer. Staying in the moment is a very great quality. He is such a rare Actor. NTR has the capability to match his Grandfather. He is disciplined, honest, straight-forward, doesn't get involved in unnecessary issues and goes to any extent to achieve what is necessary. We needn't have to stop such a personality, just need to offer claps during his journey”. S. S. Rajamouli's magnum opus RRR, where Rama Rao playing 20th century freedom fighter Komaram Bheem, opened to massive success. Rajamouli said, “I would really say there is no other actor on the Indian screen who can do what Tarak did in Komaram Bheemudo song. Showing pain, showing betrayal, showing subjugation to the motherland, but not even batting an eyelid at the oppressor. Not just showing all these emotions, but showing all these emotions in one shot, in one frame. That is like an epic.” He will be collaborating with Koratala Siva again, after Janatha Garage, for his 30th film. He has also announced his 31st film with Prashanth Neel. This will be produced by Mythri Movie Makers, his second collaboration with them after Janatha Garage. It will also be produced under his home banner, N.T.R. Arts, with Nandamuri Kalyan Ram as co-producer.

Television career 
Rama Rao hosted the reality show, Bigg Boss 1 that was broadcast on the Star Maa. Rama Rao's television debut was a huge success and had a record breaking ratings for Star Maa, making it the number one channel among all the shows. The show began airing from 16 July 2017. He has also been as a guest in Telugu reality game show Meelo Evaru Koteeswarudu  and Telugu reality dance shows Dhee 2 and Dhee 10. In February 2021, he was confirmed to be the host of Evaru Meelo Koteeswarulu. Later, on 10 July 2021, he joined the production of the show.

Personal life

Family 
Rama Rao married Lakshmi Pranathi, the daughter of realtor and businessman Narne Srinivasa Rao. Srinivasa Rao's wife is the niece of N. Chandrababu Naidu, who mediated the marriage. Their wedding took place on 5 May 2011 in Hyderabad at Hitex Exhibition Center, Madhapur. The couple have two sons.

Rama Rao is popularly referred to as Young Tiger in Tollywood and the media.

Political stint and accident 
Rama Rao was one of the campaigners for the Telugu Desam Party, for the 2009 Indian general election from April to May 2009 in Andhra Pradesh. On 26 March 2009, after electioneering, en route to Hyderabad, the SUV in which he was a passenger, was struck head-on with another vehicle, at Suryapet. He and his companions were thrown out of the SUV and suffered injuries. He was treated at Krishna Institute of Medical Sciences, in Secunderabad, where he recuperated well.

Philanthropy 
In 2009, Jr. NTR announced his plan to donate ₹20 Lakhs to the Chief Minister's Relief Fund to aid flood victims. During the  Baadshah audio function in 2013, a fan passed away due to a stampede and NTR extended his support by donating ₹5 Lakhs to the family of the deceased. Additionally, he pledged to take care of the family following the sudden loss.

In 2014, NTR once again announced a donation of ₹20 Lakhs to the CM's Relief Fund to support those affected by Cyclone Hudhud in Andhra Pradesh.

Filmography, awards and nominations

References

External links 

 
 

1983 births
Living people
Nandi Award winners
Filmfare Awards South winners
Male actors in Telugu cinema
20th-century Indian male actors
21st-century Indian male actors
Performers of Indian classical dance
Kuchipudi exponents
Indian male dancers
Indian male film actors
Dancers from Andhra Pradesh
20th-century Indian dancers
CineMAA Awards winners
Male actors from Andhra Pradesh
South Indian International Movie Awards winners
Zee Cine Awards Telugu winners
Male actors from Hyderabad, India
Telugu male actors